Soviet-type economic planning (STP) is the specific model of centralized planning employed by Marxist–Leninist socialist states modeled on the economy of the Soviet Union (USSR). 

The post-perestroika analysis of the system of the Soviet economic planning describes it as the administrative-command system due to the de facto priority of highly centralized management over planning.

Characteristics

Institutions 
The major institutions of Soviet-type planning in the USSR included a planning agency (Gosplan), an organization for allocating state supplies among the various organizations and enterprises in the economy (Gossnab) and enterprises which were engaged in the production and delivery of goods and services in the economy. Enterprises comprised production associations and institutes that were linked together by the plans formulated by Gosplan.

In the Eastern bloc countries (Bulgaria, Czechoslovakia, East Germany, Hungary, Poland, Romania, and Albania), economic planning was primarily accomplished through the Council for Mutual Economic Assistance (CMEA), an international organization meant to promote the coordination of Soviet economic policy amongst the participating countries. The council was founded in 1949 and worked to maintain the Soviet style of economic planning in the Eastern bloc until the Soviet Union's dissolution in 1991.

There is a small amount of information in state archives regarding the founding of CMEA, but documents from the Romania state archive suggest that the Romanian Communist Party was instrumental in beginning the process which led to the creation of the council. Originally, Romania wanted to create a collaborative economic system which would bolster the country's efforts to industrialize. However, the Czech and Polish representatives wanted to have a system of specialization put into place, wherein production plans would be shared amongst members, and each country would specialize in a different area of production. The USSR encouraged the formation of the council as a response to the United States’ Marshall Plan, in hopes of maintaining their sphere of influence in Eastern Europe. There also existed the hope that the less developed member states would ‘catch-up’ economically with the more industrialized ones.

Material balances 

Material balance planning was the major function of Gosplan in the USSR. This method of planning involved the accounting of material supplies in natural units (as opposed to monetary terms) which are used to balance the supply of available inputs with targeted outputs. Material balancing involves taking a survey of available inputs and raw materials in the economy and then using a balance-sheet to balance them with output targets specified by industry to achieve a balance between supply and demand. This balance is used to formulate a plan for the national economy.

Analysis of Soviet-type planning 

There are two fundamental ways scholars have carried out an analysis of Soviet-type economic planning. The first involves adapting standard neoclassical economic models and theories to analyze the Soviet economic system. This paradigm stresses the importance of Pareto efficiency standard.

In contrast to this approach, scholars such as Pawel Dembinski argue that neoclassical tools are somewhat inappropriate for evaluating Soviet-type planning because they attempt to quantify and measure phenomena specific to capitalist-based economies. They contend that because standard economic models rely on assumptions not fulfilled in the Soviet system (especially the assumption of economic rationality underlying decision-making), the results obtained from a neoclassical analysis will distort the actual effects of STP. These other scholars proceed along a different course by trying to engage with STP on its own terms, investigating the philosophical, historical and political influences that gave rise to STP whilst evaluating its economic successes and failures (theoretical and actual) with reference to those contexts.

The USSR practiced some form of central planning beginning in 1918 with War Communism until it dissolved in 1991, although the type and extent of planning was of a different nature before imperative centralized planning was introduced in the 1930s. While there were many subtleties to the various forms of economic organization the USSR employed during this 70-year time period, enough features were shared that scholars have broadly examined advantages and disadvantages of Soviet-type economic planning.

Soviet-type planning is not the same as economic planning in general as there are other theoretical models of economic planning and modern mixed economies also practice economic planning to a certain extent, but they are not subject to all of the advantages and disadvantages enumerated here.

Features 

The unique features of Soviet-style economy were an ideologically driven attempt to build a total economic plan for the whole society, as well as unquestioned paradigm of superiority of the state socialist system. Attempts to modify or optimize the former based on pragmatic analysis of economic outcomes were hindered by the latter. Dembinski describes the Soviet approach to Marxist economy as "quasi-religious" with economic publications by Marx and Lenin being treated as a "Scripture".

Michael Ellman describes specific features of the Soviet economic planning in economic and mathematical terms, highlighting its primarily computational challenges. The theoretical objective of the Soviet economic planning, as executed by Gosplan, was rational allocation of resources in a way that resulted in output of desired assortment of goods and services. The plan was built and executed in annual cycles: each year, a target output of specific goods were determined and using estimates of available input resources Gosplan would calculate balance sheets planning output for all factories. As the number of commodities reached hundreds of thousands, a number of aggregations and simplifications were made to facilitate the calculations, which until late 60's were performed manually.

Actual performance 
At first, the USSR's growth in GDP per capita compared favorably with Western Europe. In 1913, prior to the revolution of 1917, the Russian Empire had a GDP per capita of $1,488 in international dollars which grew 461% to $6,871 by 1990. By comparison, Western Europe grew from a higher base of $3,688 international dollars by a comparable 457% to $16,872 in the same period and reached $17,921 by 1998. Following the fall of the USSR in 1991, its GDP per capita figure fell to $3,893 by 1998.

One 1986 publication compared Physical Quality of Life Index (PQLI) based on infant mortality, life expectancy and literacy rate (World Bank data) and other indicators such as number of patients per physician and argued that countries with socialist-style economic planning achieved slightly better indicators at low and medium levels of income than capitalist countries at the same levels of economic development. The gap narrowed down in case of medium and high income countries, all of the latter however in the "high income" category and none "socialist".

Starting in the 1960's, the Soviet economy suffered from stagnation and became increasingly dependent on undisclosed loans from capitalist countries that were members of the Paris Club, while continuing to present Marxism as progressive and superior to a market economy. At the moment of its default and the dissolution of USSR, Russia alone owed $22 billion to the club, with other Eastern Bloc countries taking loans on their own account.

Widespread shortage of goods and failures of supply chain were presented as "temporary difficulties" by official propaganda, but numerous scholars in the Eastern bloc argued that these are systemic flaws of the Marxian economy. János Kornai coined the term "economy of shortage" to describe the state of the Soviet economy. Leszek Kołakowski presented the political and economic state of Eastern bloc authoritarianism as a logical consequence of Marxism–Leninism, rather than a "deviation". Nikolay Shmelyov described the state of the Soviet economy in the 80's as having large-scale systemic inefficiencies and unbalanced outputs, with one good being constantly in shortage, while others were constantly in surplus and wasted. These issues were naturally observed by Soviet economists, but any proposals to change the basic operating paradigms of the economic planning in response to observed inefficiencies were blocked by ideological hardliners, who perceived them as an unacceptable deviation from Marxism–Leninism, an economic model which they perceived to be "scientifically" proven to be superior.

The New Economic Policy (1921-1928) was a short period of economic pragmatism in the Soviet economics, introduced by Lenin in response to widely observed shortcomings of the War Communism system following the 1917 revolution. NEP, however, was criticized as reactionary and reversed by Stalin, who returned to total economic planning.

Falsification of statistics and "output juggling" of factories in order to satisfy central plans became a widespread phenomenon, leading to discrepancies between "reality of the plan" and the actual availability of goods as observed on site by consumers. Plan failures, when it was no longer possible to hide them, were blamed on sabotage and "wrecking". Shortages and poor living conditions led to industrial actions and protests, usually violently suppressed by the military and security forces, such as the Novocherkassk massacre.

Performance in the Eastern Bloc 
During the 1950s, the economic alliance between members of the Eastern bloc and the state monopoly acted as a safety net in the face of Western sanctions being imposed. As a result, the Eastern Bloc countries started to develop autarkic tendencies which would last until the Soviet Union's dissolution. Trade was also able to grow, not just between member states but within them as well, and the agrarian states of the eastern bloc began to industrialize. The Soviet Union also gave Eastern bloc countries subsidies in the form of raw materials at prices lower than those offered in the global market. However, despite these efforts, varying degrees of development still remained between the industrialized countries and the more agrarian ones, which would contribute to the Bloc's economic stagnation in later decades.

The council began to lose its credibility from the 1960s onwards, because disagreements between member countries over the necessity of various reforms led to the slowing of economic growth. In order to encourage economic integration and maintain soviet economic planning, the International Bank for Economic Cooperation was established in Moscow in 1963, and the ‘transferable ruble’ was introduced. The integration failed to materialize for a number of reasons. Firstly, the new currency was separated from foreign trade as is characteristic of centralized planned economies, and so was not able to perform the various functions of money outside of being a unit of account  Additionally, integration failed due to a general lack of interest, as well as the implementation of ‘market liberalization’ policies within several member states throughout the decade. Hence, the CMEA switched gears in the second half of the 1960s, and instead a reform was proposed which encouraged countries to pursue their own specialized industrialization projects without the needed participation of all other member states. East Germany, Poland, Hungary, and Czechoslovakia agreed to these terms, however Bulgaria and Romania did not, and many political officials throughout the Eastern bloc prevented the ‘market liberalization’ policies from being implemented at the CMEA level. The inability for member countries to reach a consensus about economic reforms coupled with the desire to create ‘dynamics of dissent’ within the Council against the USSR contributed to a lack of planning coordination by the CMEA throughout the decade.

In the 1970s, the CMEA adopted a few initiatives in order to continue economic growth and to modernize the economy. Firstly, the Eastern bloc heavily imported technology from the West in order to modernize, increasing the debt of the Eastern Bloc to the West dramatically. In 1971, the CMEA introduced the ‘complex program’, designed to promote further trade integration. This integration plan heavily relied on countries specializing in the production of certain goods and services, and parallel initiatives were discouraged and to be avoided. For instance, Hungary specialized in the manufacturing of buses for local and long-distance transport, which encouraged other member countries to trade with Hungary in order to acquire them.

However, the economic problems of the Eastern bloc continued to increase as reforms failed to pass and specialization efforts failed to incentivize states to improve their products. This resulted in economic growth which paled in comparison to that of the West. In a study assessing the technical efficiency of three Eastern bloc countries (Hungary, Poland, and Yugoslavia) from the 1970s to the 1980s and comparing it to that of developed and developing countries, it was found that the three European socialist countries were less efficient than both developed and developing countries, and this efficiency gap had only widened in the years of analysis. Additionally, among those three countries, Yugoslavia was consistently the most efficient throughout the period of study, followed by Hungary, then Poland. The raw material subsidies (Molotov Plan) that the Soviet Union had provided since the 1950s were drastically reduced to the point of insignificance by the end of the 1980s, due to Eastern bloc countries having to buy industrial goods at a higher price than what was offered on the global market. The lack of support from the USSR as well as the lack of political consensus over reforms only hastened the decline of the CMEA.

Advantages 
From a neoclassical perspective, the advantages of STP are quite limited. One advantage of STP is the theoretical possibility to avoid inflation. Complete price stability is achievable, not only because the state plans all prices and quantities, but also because the state has complete control over the money supply via the wages it pays as the sole employer.

However, the USSR arguably never realized this theoretical possibility. It suffered from both open and repressed inflation throughout much of its history because of failure to balance the above equation.

Another advantage of economic planning from the neoclassical perspective is the ability to eliminate unemployment (with the exception of frictional unemployment) and business cycles. Since the state is effectively the sole business proprietor and controls banking, it theoretically avoids classic financial frictions and consumer confidence challenges. Because the state makes labor compulsory and can run enterprises at a loss, full employment is a theoretical possibility even when capital stocks are too low to justify it in a market system. This was an advantage that the USSR arguably realized by 1930, although critics argue that sometimes certain segments of Soviet labor exhibited zero productivity, meaning that although workers were on employment rolls, they essentially sat idle because of capital deficiencies, i.e. there was employed unemployment.

Those scholars who reject the neoclassical viewpoint consider the benefits of STP that the USSR itself adduced. One is the ability to control for externalities directly in the pricing mechanism. Another is the total capture of value obtained in STP which is neglected in market economies. By this, it is meant that while a worker might put in a certain amount of work to produce a good, a market might value that good at less than the cost of labor the worker put in, effectively negating the value of the work done. Because in STP prices are set by the state, STP avoids this pitfall by never pricing an item below its labor value. While these do seem to be valid theoretical advantages to STP (especially under a Marxist–Leninist framework), it has been argued by some that STP as implemented by the USSR failed to achieve these theoretical possibilities.

Disadvantages 
From a neoclassical perspective, there were many disadvantages to STP. They can be divided into two categories: macroeconomic and microeconomic.

Macroeconomic disadvantages included systemic undersupply, the pursuit of full employment at a steep cost, price fixing's devastating effect on agricultural incentives and the loss of the advantages of money because STP eschews money's classic role. Additionally, planners had to aggregate many types of goods and inputs into a single material balance because it was impossible to create an individual balance for each of the approximately 24 million items produced and consumed in the USSR. This system introduced a strong bias towards underproduction, resulting in a scarcity of consumer goods. Another disadvantage is that while STP does allow for the theoretically possibility of full employment, the USSR often achieved full employment by operating enterprises at a loss or leaving workers idle. There was always a Pareto superior alternative available to the USSR rather than full employment, specifically with the option to close some enterprises and make transfer payments to the unemployed.

The microeconomic disadvantages from a neoclassical perspective include the following: 
 Encouragement of black-market activity because of fixed resource allocation.
 Low quality of Soviet goods induced by shielding them from world markets.
 The neglect of consumer need because of the challenge in measuring good quality.
 The tendency of enterprise-level Soviet managers to understate productive capacity in fear of the ratchet effect. This effect resulted from an enterprise overproducing in a given plan cycle. They would have to match their new level of higher production in the next cycle as the plan was adjusted to fit the new data.
 An anti-innovation bias (also from fear of the ratchet effect).
 Storming (shturmovshchina), i.e. the hurry to complete the plan at the end of a planning cycle resulting in poor production quality.
 Scattering of resources, i.e. excessive spread (raspylenie sredstv), where too many projects (especially construction) would have been started simultaneously and it took much longer to complete because of a lack of available inputs on time

Scholars who reject the neoclassical approach produce a shorter list of disadvantages, but because these disadvantages are valid even from the Soviet perspective, they are perhaps even more damning of STP than those listed above. These scholars consider STP's inability to predict things like weather, trade and technological advancement as an insurmountable drawback to the planning procedure. STP's use of coercive techniques such as the ratchet effect and labor camps which are argued to be inherent to STP on the one hand ensured the system's survival and on the other hand resulted in the distorted information that made effective planning challenging if not impossible. Lastly, these scholars argue that the semantic limitations of language made it impossible for STP planners to communicate their desires to enterprises in sufficient detail for planning to fully direct economic outcomes. Enterprises themselves under STP still made a variety of economic decisions autonomously.

After the collapse of the USSR, other scholars have argued that a central deficiency of Soviet economic planning was that it was not premised on final consumer demand and that such a system would be increasingly feasible with advances in information technology.

See also 

 Eastern Bloc economies
 Economic planning
 Economy of the Soviet Union
 Five-year plans for the national economy of the Soviet Union
 Material balance planning
 Planned economy
 Project Cybersyn
 Socialist calculation debate
 Socialist economics
 State capitalism
 State socialism
 Administrative-command system

References 

Economy of the Soviet Union
Economic planning
Marxism–Leninism
Socialism